Kaminuma Bluff is a bold ice-covered bluff that rises to over  near the shore in southeastern Ross Island, off the coast of Antarctica. The bluff is midway between Cape MacKay and Cape Crozier. At the suggestion of P.R. Kyle, it was named by the Advisory Committee on Antarctic Names (2000) after Katsutada Kaminuma of the National Institute of Polar Research (Japan), who was a founding member of the International Mount Erebus Seismic Study, 1980–81 through 1986. This was a joint project with the United States, Japan, and New Zealand. Kaminuma was the lead Japanese member and continued to work in Antarctica and on Mount Erebus for many years.

References

Cliffs of Ross Island